Christopher M. Fierro (born February 22, 1980) is an American politician who is a Democratic member of the Rhode Island House of Representatives, representing the 51st District since 2 January 2009. During the 2009-2010 sessions, he served on the House Committee on Finance. Fierro was defeated for reelection in the 14 September November 2010 Democratic primary elections to Robert D. Phillips, who went on to win the seat in the general election.

References

External links
Rhode Island House - Representative Christopher Fierro official RI House website

Democratic Party members of the Rhode Island House of Representatives
1980 births
Living people
People from Woonsocket, Rhode Island
University of Massachusetts Amherst alumni